Albert Beaumont Wood  DSc (1890 – 19 July 1964), better known as A B Wood, was a British physicist, known for his pioneering work in the field of underwater acoustics and sonar. Wood is known for his work on developing sonar (known at that time as 'ASDICS') in the UK from the First World War until after the Second World War.

Education
He graduated from Manchester University with First Class Honours in 1912, where he joined a team of notable scientists led by Sir Ernest Rutherford (later Lord Rutherford), including Henry Moseley, Hans Geiger, Niels Bohr, Ernest Marsden, James Chadwick, George de Hevesy and Charles Galton Darwin. In 1914 he was appointed a research fellow at the University of Liverpool and then a lecturer in physics.  He still kept in touch with Rutherford, who was working on underwater acoustics, and arranged for him to work on countering the German naval threat. He was awarded his DSc degree by his university in 1919 and became a Fellow of the Physical Society in 1920.  He was a founder member of the Institute of Physics.

War service
He joined the Board of Invention and Research in October 1915, shortly after its creation, to help with the UK war effort against Germany. Wood served the Admiralty in Aberdour in 1915 establishing the Admiralty Experimental Station that later moved to Parkstone Quay and Shandon as head of the experimental station he worked on a variety of acoustics projects. He joined the Admiralty Research Laboratory in Teddington when this body was formed in 1921, where he eventually became Deputy Superintendent. He was Deputy Superintendent of H M Signal School, Chief Scientist of H M Mining School and Deputy Director of Physical Research for the Royal Scientific Civil Service. Though he formally retired from the Admiralty Research Laboratories in 1950, he returned to continue his work on underwater sound. He spend a year at the US Naval Electronics Laboratory shortly before his death. In 1939 A B Wood was awarded the title Officer of the Order of the British Empire, in recognition of his work on dismantling a German magnetic mine at the start of the Second World War.

Awards
In 1951 he was awarded the Duddell Medal by the Institute of Physics and in 1961 the Pioneers of Underwater Acoustics Medal by the Acoustical Society of America.
The A B Wood Medal is awarded by the Institute of Acoustics in his name.

Publications
 A. B. Wood, A Textbook of Sound, Bell, 1930, 3rd revised edition 1955.

Family life
Wood married his wife Ethel in 1916. In 2022 a blue plaque commemorating Wood's achievements was unveiled at Wood's former home in Uppermill, Saddleworth, Yorkshire.

References

 A. B. Wood, From the Board of Invention and Research to the Royal Naval Scientific Service, Journal of the Royal Naval Scientific Service Vol 20, No 4, pp 1–100 (185–284).

1890 births
1964 deaths
British physicists
Academics of the University of Manchester
Members of HM Scientific Civil Service
Civil servants in the Admiralty
20th-century Royal Navy personnel